Mars Hill Anderson Rosenwald School (also known as Anderson School) is a historic school building in Mars Hill, North Carolina.

History 
In 1928, the school was built to educate Mars Hill's African-American children.

It served Madison County and portions of Yancey County from 1928 to 1965, when it closed as a result of North Carolina's school integration. It is one of only two surviving Rosenwald schools in the state's westernmost region, and was restored between 2009 and 2019.

In 2018, it was inscribed on the National Register of Historic Places.

References

External links 
Mars Hill Anderson Rosenwald School's preservation portal

High schools in North Carolina
School buildings on the National Register of Historic Places in North Carolina
Works Progress Administration in North Carolina
School buildings completed in 1938
Buildings and structures in Madison County, North Carolina
National Register of Historic Places in Madison County, North Carolina